PalaScapriano is an indoor sporting arena located in Teramo, central Italy.  It was inaugurated in 1980, and restored in the 2002-2008 period.

The capacity of the arena is 3,500 people. It has an elliptical dome in mixed brick-concrete construction, measuring 63 x 44.30 meters. It is currently home to the  Teramo Basket.

References

Indoor arenas in Italy
Basketball venues in Italy
Sports venues in Abruzzo 
Sports venues completed in 1980